Lupič Legenda is a 1972 Czechoslovak drama film directed by Karel Steklý.

Cast
 Eduard Cupák
 Vladimír Menšík
 Bohuslav Čáp
 Eliška Balzerová
 Jan Kúkol
 Jiří Holý
 Consuela Morávková
 Vladimír Brabec
 Martin Růžek
 Josef Beyvl
 Josef Větrovec
 Jaroslav Satoranský

References

External links
 

1972 films
1972 drama films
Czech drama films
Czechoslovak drama films
1970s Czech-language films
Films directed by Karel Steklý
1970s Czech films